The Field was the inaugural exhibition at the National Gallery of Victoria’s new premises on St Kilda Road, Melbourne. Launched by the director of London’s Tate gallery, Norman Reid,  before an audience of 1,000 invitees, it was held between held 21 August and 28 September 1968. Hailed then, and regarded since as a landmark exhibition in Australian art history, it presented the first comprehensive display of colour field painting and abstract sculpture in the country in a radical presentation, between silver foil–covered walls and under geometric light fittings, of 74 works by 40 artists. All practised hard-edge, geometric, colour and flat abstraction, often in novel media including coloured or transparent plastic, fluorescent acrylic paints, steel and chrome. The art was appropriate to a launch of the new venue itself, designed by architect Roy Grounds, and emphatically rectilinear; cubes nested in a basalt rectangular box amongst the other buildings of the new Arts Centre, each based on a geometric solid. Echoing emerging international stylistic tendencies of the time, The Field sparked immediate controversy and launched the careers of a new generation of Australian artists.

The curators 
Director of the NGV, the English curator Eric Westbrook, was determined to have the new gallery engage with contemporary art and accessible to broader audiences, and he supported curators of the exhibition John Stringer, Exhibitions Officer, and Brian Finemore, Curator of Australian Art, in their aim to showcase contemporary Australian art not previously seen in major institutions, but which had been emerging in a few commercial galleries, and in which the artists reflected an international tendency. It was intended to be the first of a series of exhibitions presenting aspects of contemporary Australian art. The working title had been Conceptual Abstraction, characterising the style of many of the works, but it was changed to The Field (a double-entendre joining Greenbergian flatness with racetrack associations) at the suggestion of Rollin Schlicht, one of the exhibitors.

Emphasis 
The curators acknowledged their bias towards a particular form of abstraction; they included neither artists with established reputations, such as those of the nationalist, or arguably provincial, movements culminating in the 1959 Antipodean Manifesto and exhibition, nor the concurrently practicing expressionist abstractionists John Olsen, Leonard French or Roger Kemp. Gary Catalano notes;

Instead, the emphasis was on internationalism, especially the influence of contemporary movements in American art, of which Sydney Ball, Ian Burn, Clement Meadmore and Mel Ramsden had direct experience, alongside James Doolin, a visiting American who via his teaching in Sydney and Melbourne, introduced many, particularly Robert Jacks, Dale Hickey, Robert Hunter and Robert Rooney to the hard-edge, colour field, minimal and geometric styles.

The exhibition followed the visit to Melbourne made during the UNESCO critic's seminar by Britain's Al Alvarez and New York art critic Clement Greenberg. The latter identified and promoted Colour Field painting, and while in Melbourne judged the 1968 Georges Invitation Art Prize awarding it to Sydney Ball (who between 1963 and 1965 had been living in New York) for his colour field painting, thus legitimising the work of contemporary Australian abstraction. 

Australian artists included in The Field were practising in this style prior to 1968, some having no overseas experience. Stringer had worked as consulting curator for the Museum of Modern Art (MoMA), New York, travelling exhibition Two Decades of American Painting, which opened at the NGV in 1967. As the first large-scale survey of contemporary American art, including abstraction by Josef Albers, Ad Reinhardt and Mark Rothko, it was an important influence on 1960s Australian art. Critic James Gleeson however, denied that the artists in The Field were exercising 'conscious imitation of specifically American attitudes, but that while Two Decades of American Painting provided an additional stimulus, 'the revolution in Australia had already begun.' It was a 'clear and unequivocal announcement that a large number of Australian painters had accepted the notion that art should be non-expressive and uncommunicative,' promoted 'long before…by galleries like Central Street and Gallery A' [and Pinacotheca, then in St Kilda, which concurrently with the NGV show advertised 'for viewing' 15 of The Field artists in its stockroom alongside a solo by Rollin Schlicht].The Field, being at the NGV, Gleeson emphasised, simply brought much wider attention to revolutionary young artists sought out while still in art school by curators who were obliged to ‘show what is happening at the spearhead of art.’ 

In parallel, there were Canadian influences on the work of Jack and Hunter (residing in Canada at the time work was selected and who freighted their paintings into Australia), and British and European influences also amongst several exhibitors born in, or who had travelled to, Europe and the United Kingdom, such as Janet Dawson, one of only three women in The Field, who was exposed to School of Paris, Art Povera and Tachiste abstraction during residencies in Paris and Italy in 1959-60.

Reception 
Gleeson, in summing up the year, proclaimed; "As far as art is concerned, 1968 will be chiefly remembered as the year of the Field Exhibition." That the exhibition was held a public institution, the National Gallery of Victoria, led critics and commentators to react to it as an augury of the future of Australian art and of national identity. For some it was seen as a threat; especially Herald newspaper critic Alan McCulloch, supporter of many of the Antipodean group, who condemned it as ephemeral, a "wholesale imitation of another country’s abstract art", and "a serious threat to the emerging creative spirit which during the last fifteen years has been given distinct and promising identity to Australian painting." Influential as a critic and as author of The Encyclopedia of Australian Art, released in the same year as The Field, McCulloch continued to condemn the styles the show represented.  Dealer Rudy Komon and sculptor Norma Redpath delivered scathing assessments of the show on opening night, and artists Clifton Pugh and Albert Tucker criticised the exhibition for its 'internationalism’ on broadcast television. Defenders included art patron John Reed, director of the gallery styled, after MoMA, the ‘Museum of Contemporary Art Australia’,  and also writers of The Field catalogue Elwyn Lynn, and Age newspaper critic (and later, from 1981, Director of the NGV) Patrick McCaughey who announced the show ‘a new direction’, in his essay 'The significance of The Field published in Art & Australia in December 1968, and as suggesting different conventions, beliefs and pre-suppositions about the nature of the work of art and the role of Australian artists.

The artists 
Selected for exhibition were forty artists then working in a flat, abstract, patterned, geometric or colour field style. Nine were under 30, and many had yet to have a solo show. Their youth and lack of experience annoyed some established artists, and their devotion to international styles raised fears for the saleability of 'genuine' Australian art. The three women artists are shown in rows coloured yellow in the table:

Legacy 
The Field continued to be the subject of debate and theorising for fifty years and it has been revisited in subsequent shows; 

 The Field Now (1984) 
 Australian Art 1960-1986: Field to Figuration (1987) 
 Fieldwork (2002)  
 The Field Revisited (2018) 

The original show established abstraction as significant in contemporary Australian art and in its recognition by the public, and confirmed the public art museum as a venue that could display the ‘avant-garde’ and challenge ideas. It is argued by art historian Jim Berryman and others that The Field represented the tail-end of Modernism, with many of the artists represented moving in other directions, toward Post-Modernism.

References

Australian art
Art exhibitions in Australia
Modernism
Postmodernism
1968 establishments in Australia
Abstract art